Agrostis castellana, the highland bent, dryland bent or dryland browntop, is a species of cool-season grass in the family Poaceae. It is native to Macaronesia and the Mediterranean, has been widely introduced elsewhere, and is considered an invasive species in some locales. It is a hyperaccumulator of zinc and lead.

References

castellana
Flora of the Azores
Flora of Madeira
Flora of the Canary Islands
Flora of Morocco
Flora of Algeria
Flora of Portugal
Flora of Spain
Flora of France
Flora of Corsica
Flora of Italy
Flora of Yugoslavia
Flora of Albania
Flora of Greece
Flora of Bulgaria
Flora of European Turkey
Flora of Turkey
Flora of Syria
Flora of Lebanon
Plants described in 1842